Hypsotropa ochricostella is a species of snout moth in the genus Hypsotropa. It was described by George Hampson in 1918 and is known from Mashonaland in Zimbabwe and South Africa.

References

Moths described in 1918
Anerastiini
Taxa named by George Hampson